Danville Historic District and variations may refer to:

Danville Main Street Historic District, Danville, Indiana, listed on the NRHP in Indiana
Danville Commercial District, Danville, Kentucky, listed on the NRHP in Kentucky
Danville Historic District (Danville, Pennsylvania), listed on the NRHP in Pennsylvania 
Danville West Market Street Historic District, Danville, Pennsylvania, listed on the NRHP in Pennsylvania
Danville Historic District (Danville, Virginia), listed on the NRHP in Virginia
Downtown Danville Historic District, Danville, Virginia, listed on the NRHP in Virginia
North Danville Historic District, Danville, Virginia, listed on the NRHP in Virginia

See also
Dansville Downtown Historic District, Dansville, New York, listed on the NRHP in New York